Emori Katalau (born on 9 April 1967 in Rakiraki) is a Fijian former rugby union player who played as lock. He is nicknamed "Skylab" due to his line-out jumps. Currently, he coaches Rhigos RFC.

Career
Katalau first played for Fiji against Canada, in Nadi, on 8 April 1995. He also played in the 1999 Rugby World Cup, where he played 4 matches, as well in the 2003 Rugby World Cup, playing only the match against Japan, on
23 October 2003, in Townsville being his last international cap. He played his club career for Poverty Bay, North Harbour, Exeter Chiefs, Dunvant RFC and Llanelli RFC.

References

External links
Emori Katalau at New Zealand Rugby History

Emori Katalau European competition stats
Emori Katalau profile on Teivovo.com

1967 births
Living people
Fijian rugby union players
Rugby union locks
Fiji international rugby union players
People from Ra Province